Košice-Západ (literally: "Košice-West") is a borough (city ward) of Košice, Slovakia. It borders the borough of Old Town in the east, Košice-Sever in the north, Sídlisko KVP in the west, Luník IX in the southwest and Košice-Juh in the southeast. The area of the borough is frequently nicknamed "Terasa".

History 

Construction of the microdistrict began in the late 1950s and early 1960s, intended as one of the first major post-war developments in housing estate construction in Košice. The borough officially opened on the 22 February 1962. The working title for the development was Nové Mesto ("New Town"), reflecting its proximity to the nearby Old Town, but the more popular title adopted for the new borough became Terasa ("Terrace"). Currently, there are more than 39,000 people living in the borough, the highest population of all 22 boroughs of Košice.

The borough's housing estates built in the 1960s were dubbed "Luník", in honour of the Soviet Luna series of lunar probes. All of the Luník housing estates in Košice are located in the Košice-Západ borough (from Luník I to Luník VIII), the only exception being Luník IX, which forms its own borough.

Statistics
 Area: 
 Population: 39,978 (December 2017)
 Population density: 7,200/km² (December 2017)
 District: Košice II
 Mayor: Marcel Vrchota (as of 2018 elections)

Gallery

References

External links

 Official website of the Košice-Západ borough 
 Article on the Košice-Západ borough at Cassovia.sk
 Official website of Košice

Boroughs of Košice